Jorit Ciro Cerullo (born 24 November 1990), professionally known as Jorit, is an Italian street artist.

Biography 
Jorit was born in Naples of mixed descent, his father, Luigi Cerullo, being a Neapolitan, his mother Jeannina, Dutch. He grew up in Quarto, on the northern perimeter of the city.  After studying at the scientific lyceum Galileo Galilei in Naples, he attended the Neapolitan Academy of Fine Arts, obtaining a first class degree.

His interest in street art began when he was 13 years old. Jorit has defined his approach as one of picking out ordinary faces from the working class to embody famous people, in the style of Caravaggio.

In the murals made by Jorit there are "hidden" writings, words and phrases that often expand the meaning of the works. They were collected for the first time by Vincenzo De Simone, a Neapolitan psychologist and photographer, as part of the "La gente di Napoli" photoproject.

Notable street murals

In August 2019, Jorit painted the face of the first man in space, Yuri Gagarin, on the facade of a twenty-story building in the district of Odintsovo, Russia. At the base of the mural is "СССР", the abbreviation for the official name of the Soviet Union in the Russian alphabet. It is the largest portrait of Gagarin in the world.

Verbano was an Italian communist militant, killed in 1980 in an ambush by three fascists who had entered his home.

Painting in the West Bank and expulsion from Israel

Jorit and another artist Salvatore Tukios were detained for three days after painting a mural depicting a Palestinian adolescent activist, Ahed Tamimi, who had become an iconic figure among Palestinians after slapping the face of an Israeli soldier outside her home in the West Bank village of Nabi Salih. The mural – whose completion was scheduled to coincide with Tamimi's release from an 8-month prison sentence – was set on the Bethlehem side of Israel's Separation Barrier. Upon their return to Naples on July 30, their families, waiting at the airport, asked that no photos be taken, as they wished to remain anonymous.

Mural of Fyodor Dostoevsky
Jorit, after the outbreak of war in Ukraine in 2022 made a mural in Naples of Fyodor Dostoevsky, in whose eye is a child in the colours of the Donetsk People's Republic. He argued that the issue had to be seen from 2014, and that the peoples of the Donbass had self-determined through two referendums, and that children of the two republics had been killed by Ukrainian army for eight years.

Acknowledgments

H was nominated to the Wolf Prize 2023. The last Italian winner of the Wolf Prize was Giorgio Parisi, later winner of the Nobel Prize for physics.

The nomination was made by Michelina Manzillo, Knight of the Italian Republic who is designated as Nominator by the organization of the Wolf Prize.

The reason that supports Jorit's candidacy is the following: «For having amplified the voices of unheard individuals and minorities thanks to street art, creating courageous and animated debates that help society advance. In the spirit of freedom of expression, a human right, his works holistically contribute to promoting inclusion, urban redevelopment and attracting tourists to forgotten urban areas » (from the Bronx to the Neapolitan suburbs). Among the other supporters of Jorit's candidacy, as experts in urban planning and sociology, there is Renato Lori, magnificent rector of the Accademia di Belle Arti di Napoli, where Jorit graduated.

References

General references 

1990 births
Italian graffiti artists
Italian muralists
Living people
Artists from Naples